, otherwise spelled Norio Oga (January 29, 1930 – April 23, 2011), was the former president and chairman of Sony Corporation, credited with spurring the development of the compact disc as a commercially viable audio format.

Biography

Early career
Ohga was born in Numazu, Shizuoka. When he was a child, he suffered tuberculosis that kept him in bed for a long time during which an acquaintance taught him physics and music. As a young man, Ohga aspired to be a professional opera singer, and went on to read at the prestigious Tokyo National University of Fine Arts and Music, graduating in 1953. 

His relationship with Sony began when he wrote a highly critical letter to Tokyo Tsushin Kogyo KK (also known as Totsuko and later as Sony), complaining about their tape recorder's many failings, which got him noticed by Masaru Ibuka, Akio Morita and other Totsuko executives. Because of his insight into music and technology, the company hired him as a part-time consultant. 

Ohga went on to study music in Munich and Berlin, where he formed a friendship with the conductor Herbert von Karajan. 

Ohga's knowledge of sound and electrical engineering continued to be an asset to Sony, which led to his appointments as executive director of Sony in 1964 at the age of 34 and president of CBS/Sony Records Inc. (currently Sony Music Entertainment Japan) in 1970, by the age of 40. These youthful appointments were unprecedented in the history of the Japanese company.

Later career 
He was made the president of Sony in 1982, and the CEO of Sony in 1989. That same year, he purchased Columbia Pictures Entertainment (currently Sony Pictures Entertainment) from the Coca-Cola Company for $3.4 billion. A year earlier, Sony acquired the CBS Records Group (currently Sony Music Entertainment) from Columbia Broadcasting System. Ohga also played a key role in establishing Sony Computer Entertainment (currently Sony Interactive Entertainment) in 1993. He supported Ken Kutaragi to develop the PlayStation as a Sony-owned console.

In 1994 he succeeded co-founder Akio Morita as Sony chairman. The next year he selected Nobuyuki Idei as the company's next president, a decision he later told author John Nathan appalled 99 out of 100 people at the company, and it led to a sweeping reorganisation of the company. Idei became co-CEO with Ohga in 1998, and sole CEO in 1999. In 2000 Ohga became semi-retired, staying chairman of the board while Idei became Executive chairman. 

On November 7, 2001, Ohga collapsed onstage due to a cerebral hemorrhage while conducting an orchestra at the closing concert of the 4th Beijing Music Festival in Beijing. He later recovered his ability to speak and move after a three-month coma. 

On his 73rd birthday in 2003, Ohga retired from the board and became Honorary chairman. He served as chairman of the Tokyo Philharmonic Orchestra. 

He died of multiple organ failure at a Tokyo hospital on April 23, 2011. He was 81 years old.

Awards 
His international recognition included the Japanese Medal of Honor with Blue Ribbon (1988), Grand Cordon of the Order of the Sacred Treasure (2001) and France's Legion of Honour.

References

External links 

 Press release on his retirement, with career timeline
 Sony chairman credited with developing CDs dies
 Karuizawa Ohga Hall
 Norio Ohga Japanese business executive｜Barbara A. Schreiber｜Britannica

1930 births
2011 deaths
Sony people
Japanese chief executives
People from Numazu, Shizuoka
Tokyo University of the Arts alumni
Deaths from multiple organ failure
Knights Commander of the Order of Merit of the Federal Republic of Germany